The Baltimore and Ohio Short Line Railroad was the successor to the Pittsburgh Southern Railway, and a subsidiary of the B&O Railroad, and was organized as a legal entity 25 February 1885. The railroad was a link in the attempt of the B&O to serve the Pittsburgh market, and became part of the Wheeling Division of that railroad. It ran from Glenwood Junction to Washington, Pennsylvania, a distance of 34 miles.

See also
 Hempfield Railroad

References

3 ft gauge railways in the United States
Defunct Pennsylvania railroads
Transportation in Pittsburgh